"Make Up Your Mind" is a song by Canadian rock group Theory of a Deadman and is the second single from their eponymous debut album (2002). Released on January 13, 2003, the song's lyrics were written by the band's lead guitarist and singer Tyler Connolly and Nickelback frontman Chad Kroeger. Kroeger also produced the track along with Joey Moi. It peaked at number 13 on the Canadian Singles chart as well as the Billboard Mainstream Rock chart.

Background and development
"Make Up Your Mind" is a ballad written by lead guitarist and singer Tyler Connolly and Chad Kroeger. Kroeger also produced the track along with Joey Moi.

Release and commercial performance
The song was released in February 2003, as the second single off the band's debut studio album, Theory of a Deadman (2002). It peaked at number 13 on the Canadian Singles chart. In the United States, it reached numbers 36, 38, and 13 on Billboard's Adult Top 40, Alternative Songs (formerly Modern Rock Tracks), and Mainstream Rock charts, respectively. The single also made an appearance on Belgium's Ultratop 50 Singles chart.

Music video
The music video for "Make Up Your Mind" was directed by Gregory Dark and revolves around the dream a woman has of her wedding day, which involves her walking down the aisle as she kisses and touches random guests at an outdoor ceremony. The dream ends when she leaps off a cliff. The band is seen performing on rocky terrain throughout the video.

Track listings
US promo CD
 "Make Up Your Mind" (radio mix) – 3:48
 "Make Up Your Mind" (reduced guitar mix) – 3:48
 "Make Up Your Mind" (acoustic guitar version) – 3:48

European CD single
 "Make Up Your Mind" (radio mix)
 "Midnight Rider"

Personnel
Credits are lifted from the US promo CD liner notes.

Theory of a Deadman
 Tyler Connolly – lead vocals, guitar, writing
 Tim Hart – drums, background vocals
 Dean Back – bass
 David Brenner – guitar

Others
 Chad Kroeger – writing, production
 Joey Moi – production
 Randy Staub – mixing

Charts

Release history

References

Theory of a Deadman songs
2002 songs
2003 singles
604 Records singles
Songs written by Chad Kroeger
Songs written by Tyler Connolly
Music videos directed by Gregory Dark